Hepialus xiaojinensis is a species of moth of the family Hepialidae. It is found in Sichuan, China.

Etymology
The species is named after the type locality, Xiaojin County, Aba City, Sichuan Province.

References

Moths described in 2009
Endemic fauna of Sichuan
Moths of Asia
Hepialidae